Gobert is a surname. Notable people with the surname include:

André Gobert (1890–1951), French tennis player
Anthony Gobert (born 1975), Australian motorcycle road racer
Dedrick D. Gobert (1971-1994), American actor
Émile Joseph Isidore Gobert (1838–1922), French entomologist
Jacques-Nicolas Gobert (1760–1808), French general
Jos Gobert (1922–unknown), Belgian chess master
Pierre Gobert (1662–1744), French painter
Rudy Gobert (born 1992), French basketball player